Chido "Chichie" Dzingirai or Dringirai (born October 25, 1991) is a Zimbabwean footballer who plays for Flame Lily Queens F.C. and the Zimbabwe women's national football team. She began her career as a forward with local team Mbare Queens, before retraining as a goalkeeper and moving to Cyclone Stars in 2008. In 2011, she transferred to Flame Lily Queens, the club of the Zimbabwe Prison Services, who found her a job as a prison officer. She debuted for the Zimbabwe women's national football team ("The Mighty Warriors") in 2008. At the 2015 CAF Women's Olympic Qualifying Tournament, she made multiple saves in the decisive win over Cameroon which clinched Zimbabwe's shock qualification for the final tournament in Brazil.

References

External links
 

1991 births
Living people
Zimbabwean women's footballers
Zimbabwe women's international footballers
Footballers at the 2016 Summer Olympics
Olympic footballers of Zimbabwe
Women's association football goalkeepers